Cette vie nouvelle is the name of the debut album of the French singer Priscilla Betti. Released in June 2002, it was preceded by the two singles "Quand je serai jeune" and  "Cette Vie nouvelle" (a cover version of the famous hit "What a Feeling", from the soundtrack of Flashdance), which were both top-ten hits in France. Another song from the album was released as a third single, "Bla bla bla".

The songs were composed by various artists, including Philippe Swan (he wrote "Votre Fille"), who charted in France in 1989 with his song "Dans ma rue" (#36). Philippe Osman and Bertrand Châtenet, who had wholly composed the following albums of Priscilla, also participated in this album: Osman composed six songs, made the arrangements and played the keyboards and the guitar, while Châtenet mixed them.

On the French Albums Chart, the album peaked at #18 in its fifth week on July 6, 2002, and remained on the chart for 18 weeks. It was certified Silver disc by the SNEP, the French certifier.

Track listing

 "Bla bla bla" — 2:35
 "Cette Vie nouvelle" — 3:48
 "Plus" — 3:19
 "Qui que tu sois" — 3:58
 "Tout arrive" — 4:07
 "C'est vrai" — 4:16
 "Quand je serai jeune" — 4:09
 "Belles autrement" — 3:47
 "Fou d'elle" — 4:04
 "Votre fille" — 2:50 
+ Extras :
 "Cette Vie nouvelle" (music video)
 "Cette Vie nouvelle" (karaoke)
 Gallery of photos
 Awake screen
 Biography

Certifications

Charts

References

2002 debut albums
Priscilla Betti albums